The Columbia and Nehalem Valley Railroad was a standard gauge logging railroad near Columbia City, Oregon, which was owned by the Portland-based Peninsular Lumber Company.

Location 
The track started in Columbia City and was planned to be built to Pittsburg in the Nehalem Valley. It went uphill in a westward direction onto the heights between Milton Creek and Merrill Creek.

History 
The investors Goodsell, Giltner & Sewell of Portland announced on 7 March 1902 that they would build a logging railroad from Columbia City to Pittsburg. They planned to use 6 steam locomotives.

On 29 June 1906, Giltner & Sewell of Portland sold  of forest for  $200,000 to the Peninsular Lumber Co., including  of track and a jetty at the Columbia River. The sales price was based on stumpage of $1.25 per thousand. The Peninsular Lumber Co. owned a saw mill at the river, to which it could raft the logs.

The track was extended to  until 1912 but didn't reach as far as Yankton.

Bridges 

A combined crib and trestle bridge was used to cross the McBride Creek. The sniped faces of the logs show that they were probably drawn by animals towards the construction site.  This was sometimes done to allow construction before the area was accessible to heavy equipment.

Locomotives 
At least two or three steam locomotives were used, which were fired by wood. One of them was a 35 t geared Climax locomotive and one was a smaller conventional Lima locomotive. It is possible that additionally a geared Shay was used. One of them was a small Baldwin 2-8-2 Mikado.

References 

Defunct Oregon railroads
Logging railroads in the United States
Transportation in Columbia County, Oregon